The old Spencer Public Library is a former public library and historic Carnegie library located at Spencer, Owen County, Indiana.  It was built in 1912, and is a one-story, three bay, American Craftsman style brick building on a raised basement. It has a low-pitched hipped roof and projecting entry bay.  It was constructed with a $10,000 grant provided by the Carnegie Foundation.

The building ceased its function as a public library in 1997. The Owen County Heritage & Culture Center occupies the space today. Currently, Owen County Public Library operates the only library branch in Owen County at 10 S. Montgomery St. in Spencer

The building was listed on the National Register of Historic Places in 2007.

References

Carnegie libraries in Indiana
Libraries on the National Register of Historic Places in Indiana
Bungalow architecture in Indiana
Library buildings completed in 1912
Buildings and structures in Owen County, Indiana
National Register of Historic Places in Owen County, Indiana